Wolf Martin Garber (May 18, 1922 – October 17, 2019), known professionally as Bill Macy, was an American television, film and stage actor, best known for his role in the CBS television series Maude (1972–1978).

Early life 
Bill Macy was born Wolf Martin Garber on May 18, 1922, in Revere, Massachusetts, the son of Mollie (née Friedopfer; 1889–1986) and Michael Garber (1884–1974), a manufacturer. He was raised Jewish in the East Flatbush section of  Brooklyn, New York. After graduating from Samuel J. Tilden High School he served in the United States Army from 1942 to 1946 with the 594th Engineer Boat and Shore Regiment, stationed in the Philippines, Japan and New Guinea. He worked as a cab driver for a decade before being cast as Walter Matthau's understudy in Once More, with Feeling on Broadway in 1958. He portrayed a cab driver on the soap opera The Edge of Night in 1966.

Macy was an original cast member of the 1969–1972 Off-Broadway sensation Oh! Calcutta!, performing in the show from 1969 to 1971. He later appeared in the 1972 movie version of the musical. Of appearing fully nude with the rest of the cast in the stage show, he said, "The nudity didn't bother me. I'm from Brooklyn."

Macy performed on the P.D.Q. Bach album The Stoned Guest (1970).

Television 
Appreciating Macy's comedic skills off Broadway, Norman Lear brought him to Hollywood, where he first got a small part as a police officer in All in the Family. He was cast in the role of Walter Findlay, the long-suffering husband of the title character on the 1970s television sitcom Maude, starring Bea Arthur. The show ran for six seasons from 1972 to 1978.

Strangers on the street often called him "Mr. Maude", consoling him for having such a difficult wife. "I used to tell them that people like that really existed," Macy explained.

In 1975, Macy and Samantha Harper Macy appeared on the game show Tattletales.

In 1986, Macy was a guest on the fourth episode of L.A. Law, playing an older man whose young wife wants a music career. Macy appeared in the television movie Perry Mason: The Case of the Murdered Madam (1987) as banker Richard Wilson. He occasionally appeared on Seinfeld as one of the residents of the Florida retirement community where Jerry Seinfeld's parents lived. Macy made a guest appearance as a patient on Chicago Hope and as an aging gambler on the series Las Vegas. Macy's last television role occurred in a 2010 episode of Jada Pinkett Smith's series Hawthorne.

Film 
Macy appeared as the jury foreman in The Producers in 1967, with the memorable sole line "We find the defendants incredibly guilty". Other memorable roles include the co-inventor of the "Opti-Grab" in the 1979 Steve Martin comedy The Jerk and as the head television writer in My Favourite Year (1982).

Other film credits included roles in Death at Love House (1976), The Late Show (1977), Serial (1980), Movers & Shakers (1985), Bad Medicine (1985), Tales from the Darkside (1985 - "Lifebomb" episode), Sibling Rivalry (1990), The Doctor (1991), Me Myself & I (1992), Analyze This (1999), Surviving Christmas (2004), The Holiday (2006), and Mr. Woodcock (2007).

Personal life 
Macy met his future wife, Samantha Harper, on the set of Oh! Calcutta! in 1969. They married in 1975.

Macy died on October 17, 2019, at the age of 97; no cause was given.

Filmography

References

External links 

 

1922 births
2019 deaths
American male film actors
American male television actors
People from Revere, Massachusetts
American male musical theatre actors
American television personalities
Male television personalities
Place of death missing
Jewish American male actors
Male actors from Massachusetts
20th-century American male actors
21st-century American male actors
21st-century American Jews